Gulliksen is a surname. Notable people with the surname include:

Geir Gulliksen (born 1960), Norwegian show jumper
Geir Gulliksen (writer) (born 1963), Norwegian poet, novelist, playwright, children's writer, essayist and publisher
Harold Gulliksen (1903–1996), American psychologist
Kevin Gulliksen (born 1996), Norwegian handball player
Rune Gulliksen (born 1963), Norwegian ice hockey player
Tobias Fjeld Gulliksen (born 2003), football player

Norwegian-language surnames